Lawrence John Miller (born October 15, 1953) is an American comedian, actor, podcaster, and columnist. He is primarily regarded as a character actor, with The A.V. Club noting that he "can be counted upon to improve every film or television show he appears in". His better-known roles include Lou Bonaparte in Mad About You (1993–1998), Pointy-haired Boss in Dilbert (1999–2000), Edwin Poole in Boston Legal (2004–2008), Mr. Hollister in Pretty Woman (1990), Dean Richmond in The Nutty Professor (1996) and Nutty Professor II: The Klumps (2000), Walter Stratford in 10 Things I Hate About You (1999) and Paolo Puttanesca in The Princess Diaries (2001) and The Princess Diaries 2: Royal Engagement (2004).

Miller has also served as one of the regular players in Christopher Guest's mockumentary films.

Early life and education
Miller was born in Brooklyn and grew up in Valley Stream, New York, on Long Island. He studied music at Amherst College. He is Jewish. He has said that one of his grandmothers was from Latvia and one of his grandfathers was from Austria.

Career

Miller's first acting job was as the emcee on the TV series Fame. He gained mainstream attention for his part in popular scenes of Pretty Woman involving him as a store clerk for the main characters.

His film roles include Walter Stratford in the movie 10 Things I Hate About You as well as several characters in Christopher Guest's mockumentary movies. He has held prominent supporting roles in Carry On Columbus, The Nutty Professor, Nutty Professor II: The Klumps, and Max Keeble's Big Move. He has over 50 film appearances.

He was part of the main cast of Life's Work, The Pursuit of Happiness, and High School Cupid, a Cupid Inc. Story. He is also a frequent guest actor on television, most notably as the nasty doorman on Seinfeld in the episode "The Doorman". He played Edwin Poole in the ABC dramedy Boston Legal. He played nightclub owner Michael Dobson in two Law & Order episodes, first in the episode "Coma" and then later in "Encore". Miller appeared as himself in a third episode, "Smoke". He was also in 8 Simple Rules for Dating My Teenage Daughter, where he played Tommy, Kyle's obnoxious father and Paul's (John Ritter) colleague.

He is friends with Jerry Seinfeld, and once auditioned for the part of George Costanza.

Other work
As a stand-up comic, he is best known for his monologue "The Five Levels of Drinking", which Vulture hailed as "masterful, well-written, and influential".

From 2002 to 2004, Miller wrote a column for the magazine The Weekly Standard that usually ran once every two weeks. Since then, he continued to occasionally contribute to the magazine, and to the Washington Examiner, which absorbed The Weekly Standard when it ceased publication. His subject matter has included politics as well as reminiscences about fellow entertainers and anecdotes from his own life.

Two of the columns he wrote in 2002 served as the text for frequently forwarded emails at the time, though in both cases his words were attributed to others. The first was his very first Weekly Standard column in January 2002, in which he mocked various anti-war platitudes of the time; the text was incorrectly attributed to retired Air Force general Richard E. Hawley. The second was an April 2002 column defending Israel in the Israeli–Palestinian conflict, which was attributed to fellow comedian Dennis Miller. Another email which also began to be forwarded in 2002, purporting to offer "George Carlin's Views on Aging", was derived in part from a stand-up routine that Larry Miller performed in the 1990s.

Miller began a weekly podcast on the Carolla Digital Network, This Week with Larry Miller, suspending it after falling and injuring his head severely in April 2012. After hospitalization and a coma, he said in January 2013 that he was convalescing. Miller resumed the podcast on January 9, 2013. In February 2015 the podcast was retitled The Larry Miller Show with direct distribution. The podcast ended with the December 2, 2020, episode. Miller referred to it as the "grand finale" after not broadcasting a new show in the previous six months. The show page cited issues with producing the show safely during the COVID-19 pandemic.

Personal life 
Miller married television writer Eileen Conn in 1993. The couple has two children.

Filmography

Film

Television

Videos

Video games

References

External links

 Larry Miller's official website
 
 Website for the Larry Miller Show

1953 births
20th-century American comedians
21st-century American comedians
20th-century American male actors
21st-century American male actors
American game show hosts
American male film actors
American male television actors
American people of Austrian-Jewish descent
American people of Latvian-Jewish descent
American people of Latvian descent
American podcasters
American stand-up comedians
Amherst College alumni
Comedians from New York (state)
Jewish American male actors
Jewish American writers
Living people
Male actors from New York (state)
People from Valley Stream, New York
Valley Stream Central High School alumni
Jewish American male comedians
21st-century American Jews